Stomphastis cardamitis is a moth of the family Gracillariidae. It is known from South Africa and Namibia.

The larvae feed on Croton subgratissimus. They mine the leaves of their host plant. The mine has the form of a moderate, irregular, oblong, semi-transparent blotch mine which starts as a narrow, short gallery.

References

Stomphastis
Moths of Africa
Insects of Namibia